Kathleen Sullivan may refer to:
 Kathleen Sullivan (lawyer) (born 1955), American lawyer and former dean of Stanford Law School
 Kathleen Sullivan (journalist) (born 1953), American television journalist
 Kathleen Sullivan Alioto (born 1944), American educator and politician
 Kathy Sullivan (American politician) (born 1954), Kathleen Sullivan, former Chairwoman of the Democratic Party in New Hampshire

See also
Kathy Sullivan (disambiguation)
Kate Sullivan (disambiguation)
Katie Sullivan (disambiguation)
Catherine Sullivan (disambiguation)